Heroes & Friends is the sixth studio album by American country music artist Randy Travis, released in 1990. Except for the title track (which is reprised at the end), every song on this album is a duet with another recording artist. "A Few Ole Country Boys" (a duet with George Jones) and the title track were both released as singles from this album, peaking at numbers 8 and 3, respectively, on the Billboard Hot Country Singles & Tracks (now Hot Country Songs) charts in 1990.

"We're Strangers Again" was originally recorded by Merle Haggard and Leona Williams on their 1983 album Heart to Heart. The version here, a duet between Travis and Tammy Wynette, was later included on Wynette's Best Loved Hits album, from which it was released as a single in late 1991.

Track listing

Personnel

 Chet Atkins – gut string guitar, background vocals
 Kathie Baillie – choir
 Eddie Bayers – drums
 Barry Beckett – piano
 Michael Bonagura Jr. – choir
 Dennis Burnside – piano, electric piano, Wurlitzer
 Larry Byrom – acoustic guitar
 Gary Carter – steel guitar
 Mark Casstevens – acoustic guitar
 Jerry Douglas – dobro
 Clint Eastwood – duet vocals on "Smokin' the Hive"
 Steve Gibson – 12-string guitar, electric guitar, mandolin
 Bob Glaub – bass guitar
 Randy Goodrum – piano
 Vern Gosdin – duet vocals on "The Human Race"
 Doyle Grisham – steel guitar
 Merle Haggard – duet vocals on "All Night Long"
 Lib Hatcher – choir
 Sherilyn Huffman – choir, background vocals
 David Hungate – bass guitar
 David Johnson – fiddle
 Kirk "Jelly Roll" Johnson – harmonica
 George Jones – duet vocals on "A Few Ole Country Boys"
 Nancy Jones – background vocals on "A Few Ole Country Boys"
 Shane Keister – organ, piano
 B.B. King – duet vocals and electric guitar on "Waiting On The Light to Change"
 Kris Kristofferson – duet vocals on "Walk Our Own Road"
 Mike Lawler – banjo, synthesizer
 Kyle Lehning – Wurlitzer
 Chris Leuzinger – acoustic guitar
 Paul Leim – drums
 Larrie Londin – drums
 Loretta Lynn – duet vocals on "Shopping for Dresses"
 Terry McMillan – harmonica, percussion
 Jay Dee Maness – steel guitar
 Brent Mason – electric guitar
 Willie Nelson – duet vocals on "The Birth of the Blues"
 Mark O'Connor – fiddle
 Dean Parks – electric guitar
 Dolly Parton – duet vocals on "Do I Ever Cross Your Mind"
 Mickey Raphael – harmonica
 Hargus "Pig" Robbins – piano
 Roy Rogers – duet vocals on "Happy Trails"
 Brent Rowan – electric guitar
 Tom Rutledge – fiddle, acoustic guitar
 Don Schlitz – choir
 Troy Seals – choir
 Allen Shamblin – choir
 Martha Sharp – choir
 Lisa Silver – choir, background vocals 
 Denis Solee – clarinet
 Keith Stegall – choir
 Fred Tackett – acoustic guitar
 Randy Travis – lead vocals
 Conway Twitty – duet vocals on "Come See About Me"
 Diane Vanette – choir, background vocals
 Carlos Vega – drums
 Jack Williams – bass guitar
 Dennis Wilson – background vocals
 Tammy Wynette – duet vocals on "We're Strangers Again"

Charts

Weekly charts

Year-end charts

References

1990 albums
Randy Travis albums
Vocal duet albums
Warner Records albums
Albums produced by Kyle Lehning